Pogo is a village and rural commune in the Cercle of Niono in the Ségou Region of Mali. The commune has an area of approximately 550 square kilometers and includes 18 villages. In the 2009 census it had a population of 16,308.

References

External links
.

Communes of Ségou Region